The 1995 Bandy World Championship was contested between 8 men's Bandy playing nations.  The championship was played at Guidant John Rose Minnesota Oval in Roseville, Minnesota, United States on 29 January – 5 February 1995, so far the only time the men's championship has been played in America. Kazakhstan made its championship debut, whereas the Netherlands on the other hand choose not to take part in the tournament. Sweden became champions.

Squads

Group A

Premier tour
 30 January
Russia – Finland  5 – 4
Sweden – Norway   9 – 1
 31 January
Russia – Norway   10 – 2
Finland – Sweden  2 – 3
 1 February
Norway – Finland  2 – 2 (6–7 after penalty shoot-out)
Russia – Sweden   6 – 2

Group B

Premier tour
 29 January
USA – Canada	        4 – 1
 30 January
Hungary – Kazakhstan	0 – 27
 31 January
Canada – Kazakhstan	2 – 14
USA – Hungary	       11 – 3
 1 February
Canada – Hungary	4 – 4	(6–4 after penalty shoot-out)
USA – Kazakhstan	1 – 5

Final tour

Match for 7th place
 5 February
Hungary – Canada 1–9

Quarter-finals
 3 February
Norway – Kazakhstan 2 – 4
USA – Finland 1 – 6

Match for 5th place
 5 February
 Norway – USA 4–1

Semifinals
 3 February
 Russia – Kazakhstan 11–3
 Sweden – Finland 8–4

Match for 3rd place
 5 February
 Finland – Kazakhstan 3–2

Final
 5 February
 Sweden – Russia 6–4

References

1995
Bandy World Championship
Bandy World Championship
World Championship
International bandy competitions hosted by the United States
Bandy World Championship
Bandy World Championship
Sports competitions in Minnesota
Roseville, Minnesota